Electric Soul is the second studio album by the British/Vincentian musician Marlon Roudette. It was released in Germany on 8 August 2014 via Universal Music. The album entered the charts in Austria, Germany and Switzerland. It includes the singles "When the Beat Drops Out" and "Flicker".

Singles
"When the Beat Drops Out" was released as the lead single from the album on 18 July 2014. The song reached number 1 in Germany, number 2 in Austria and Switzerland, number 7 in the UK and number 15 in Australia.

"Flicker" was released as the second single from the album on 12 December 2014.

Track listing

Charts

Release history

References

2014 albums
Marlon Roudette albums